Eduardo Ramos Martins (born 25 March 1986 in Caçu) or simply Eduardo Ramos, is a Brazilian footballer.

Honours

Corinthians
Campeonato Brasileiro Série B: 2008
Campeonato Paulista: 2009

Sport Recife
Campeonato Pernambucano: 2010

Náutico
Copa Pernambuco: 2011

Paysandu
Campeonato Paraense: 2013

Remo
Campeonato Paraense: 2014, 2015

Joinville
Campeonato Brasileiro Série B: 2014

Cuiabá
Campeonato Mato-Grossense: 2019

External links
 

1986 births
Living people
Brazilian footballers
Brazilian expatriate footballers
Sport Club Corinthians Paulista players
Grêmio Foot-Ball Porto Alegrense players
Goiás Esporte Clube players
Sport Club do Recife players
Pierikos F.C. players
Expatriate footballers in Greece
Clube Náutico Capibaribe players
Esporte Clube Vitória players
Paysandu Sport Club players
Clube do Remo players
Joinville Esporte Clube players
Cuiabá Esporte Clube players
Tuna Luso Brasileira players
Ituano FC players
Amazonas Futebol Clube players
Association football midfielders